Established in 1905, the American Library Institute was an organization conceived by Melvil Dewey to provide for the investigation, study  and discussion of issues within the field of library theory and practice. Its initial membership consisted of former presidents of the American Library Association (ALA) and other library professionals who had achieved notoriety which had been recognized by their peers.

History

Formation 
A pioneer in American librarianship and an influential figure in the development of libraries in America in the late 19th and early the 20th century, Melvil Dewey played a major role in the establishment of both the American Library Association and the National Association of State Libraries. In 1904, concerned about the size of the ALA, Dewey felt the need to establish a small library league or academy which would undertake the study of librarianship in the form of small meetings and discussions. This scholarly focus, in Dewey's opinion, was no longer practical under the growing membership of the ALA. The mandate of this new institution would be thought leadership and the formation and clarification of opinions relating to library issues. The resulting findings and recommendations were then to be published. The option and responsibility to take any specific actions resulting from these findings, fell to the ALA.

A proposal was presented to the ALA council in late 1904 and a committee of five was appointed to study the formation of the proposed academy. In July 1905, at a conference in Portland, OR, the ALA voted to establish the American Library Institute. While the proposed organization would not be under the formal control of the ALA, a committee was formed consisting of 15 former ALA presidents with a mandate to draft a constitution and by-laws and to develop a plan to launch the American Library Institute.

Membership 
 Recognized library leaders and thinkers from English speaking America
 Former presidents of the American Library Association 
 Not to exceed one hundred persons

Governing structure 
 President (Board Chairman) - 2-year term
 Secretary-Treasurer - 2-year term
 Board of five members - 5-year term
 Members of ALA executive board to have seats at council
 Two meetings per year
First board included Melvil Dewey, President; Henry James Carr, Secretary-Treasurer; and James Hulme Canfield, Frederick M. Crunden, John C. Dana.

Presidents 
 Melvil Dewey 1905-08 (ALA President 1890-93)
 Arthur E. Bostwick 1909-11, 1925-27 (ALA President 1907-08)
 Frank P. Hill 1912-15 (ALA President 1905-06)
 Ernest C. Richardson 1916-18 (ALA President 1904-05)
 William N.C. Carlton 1919-21 
 Clement W. Andrews 1922-24
 Harry L. Koopman 1928-30
 Theodore W. Koch 1931-33
 Henry B. Van Hoesen 1934-36
 George B. Utley 1937-39
 Phineas L. Windsor 1940-

Dissolution 
The committee that initially defined the membership along elitist lines designed an organization that could not maintain its longterm relevancy. Records of later meetings show personal opinion and preference entering into the decision making of the institute. Subsequently, by the end of the 1930s, the institute had become not much more than a debating society for retired librarians. During the second world war there was little activity within the organization and annual meetings were suspended in 1942. A single meeting was held in 1949 to vote on the issue of dissolution of the institute. The vote was finalized the following year and remaining funds were transferred to the American Library Association in early 1951.

Notable activities 
1910 - Advocation for the publication of standards relating to the organization of public libraries.
 Appointment of library board
 Details of library appropriation
 Accounting and finance
 Library property management
 Civil service relations
1931 - Symposium on Library Planning and Equipment.

See also 
 Melville Dewey How one library pioneer profoundly influenced modern librarianship
 Harry Lyman Koopman Collection
 Phineas L. Windsor Papers
 Phineas L. Windsor - Meet the ACRL Presidents
 Henry B. Van Hoesen - Special Collections of Brown University Library, a history and guide: The 1930s and World War II

References 

Professional associations based in the United States
Library-related professional associations
1905 establishments in the United States
1951 disestablishments in the United States
Library history